Palmer Road, labelled Route 156, is a 2-lane collector highway in western Prince County, Prince Edward Island, Canada. It is between the communities of Tignish and Miminegash. The road is considered part of two larger communities, Tignish and Miminegash.

The highway runs from Route 152 (Union Road) in St. Edward, to Back Settlement Road in Nail Pond, passing through the communities of St. Edward, St. Louis, Palmer Road, and Nail Pond.

History
Route 156 (Palmer Road) is one of the longest continuous secondary highways in Prince Edward Island. It spans 8 miles from Miminegash to Nail Pond. Only the middle section of Route 156 was paved, leaving the northernmost section near Nail Pond as dirt road, as well as the southern section near St. Edward. The middle section is located in the Palmer Road community, and was first paved in 1981. It is home to the Immaculate Conception Church and another Catholic church establishment further north. The currently paved section was repaved in 2004. Sections on Route 156 north of Knox Lane intersection are considered part of the Tignish community, and sections south of here are part of St. Louis/Miminegash.

The highway runs through the community of Palmer Road, which is part of PEI's electoral district #27, Tignish-Palmer Road. This district was formerly called Tignish-DeBlois, but renamed to include the Palmer Road name in 2007.

Other information
Almost all addresses on Route 156 receive electrical power from the St. Louis/Bloomfield power substation—only addresses in the Nail Pond/Ascension area receive from Elmsdale/Tignish. Basic cable service from Eastlink nor High speed internet from Aliant Telecom have ever been available in Route 156.

List of roads merging off Route 156
Union Rd - Route 152 (Miminegash)
Thompson Rd - Route 155 (Palmer Road)
Ascension Rd - Route 160 (Nail Pond)
Harper Rd - Route 158 (Palmer Road)
Provost Rd (Leoville)
Knox Ln (Skinner's Pond)
Brennan Rd (Peterville)
Back Settlement Rd (Nail Pond)

References

156
156